The Mazda CX-4 is a compact crossover SUV that was introduced in April 2016 at the Beijing Motor Show, and is produced and sold exclusively in China by the joint venture FAW Mazda.

Overview
The design of the Mazda CX-4 production car was previewed by the concept, the Mazda Koeru. Positioned above the Mazda CX-3, the CX-4 is more similar to a station wagon in profile, while similar to the CX-5 in size. 

The CX-4 is offered with a choice of two Skyactiv straight-four engines: A 2.0-litre (PE-VPS) and a 2.5-litre (PY-VPS). The 2.0-liter Skyactiv-G engine produces 158 hp (117 kW) and the 2.5-liter Skyactiv-G engine produces 192 hp (143 kW). The 2.0-liter engine model is only available as a front wheel drive model and offers a choice between a six-speed manual transmission and the Skyactiv-Drive automatic transmission. The 2.5-liter engine model offers AWD and comes standard with the six-speed automatic transmission.

2020 facelift
The 2020 CX-4 facelift was revealed in late 2019. The facelift brings along redesigned bumpers and radiator grille, as well as new tail light patterns. The powertrain remain the same as the pre-facelift models.

Chinese copy controversy
In January 2018, Zotye Auto unveiled its crossover, the Traum MA501, which bears a striking resemblance to the CX-4.

References

External links

CX-4
Cars introduced in 2016
2020s cars
Compact sport utility vehicles
Crossover sport utility vehicles
Front-wheel-drive vehicles
All-wheel-drive vehicles